OAJ may refer to:

 OAJ, the IATA and FAA LID code for Albert J. Ellis Airport, Jacksonville, North Carolina
 Odd-Arne Jacobsen (born 1947), Norwegian guitarist and songwriter
 United Nations Office of Administration of Justice, an organization established by the United Nations